Thursday October Christian II (1 October 1820 – 27 May 1911) was a Pitcairn Islands political leader. He was the grandson of Fletcher Christian and son of Thursday October Christian, and mother, Teraura. He was also known as "Doctor", "Duddie" or "Doodie". He spent several years on Norfolk Island but returned to Pitcairn in 1864. Christian was three quarters Polynesian.

He was the fifth Magistrate of the Pitcairn Islands, holding the office in 1844, 1851, 1864, 1867, 1873–1874, 1880 and 1882. Everyone named Christian on Pitcairn is descended from him; a number of family branches, however, left Pitcairn permanently and settled on Norfolk Island.

He married Mary Young, granddaughter of Ned Young, on 24 March 1839. They had 17 children, none of them named as a month name or week day. Seven died as children and three lived past the age of 73.

Children and descendants

Ancestry

Literary reference
Thursday October Christian II appears in Mark Twain's 1879 story "The Great Revolution in Pitcairn".

See also
 Descendants of the Bounty Mutineers

References

1820 births
1911 deaths
Pitcairn Islands people of Polynesian descent
Pitcairn Islands politicians
Pitcairn Islands people of English descent
Pitcairn Islands people of Manx descent